Dyspessa thianshanica is a species of moth of the family Cossidae. It was described by Franz Daniel in 1964. It is found in Turkmenistan.

References

Moths described in 1964
Dyspessa
Moths of Asia